The 2003 Ekiti State gubernatorial election occurred on April 19, 2003. PDP's Ayo Fayose won election for a first tenure, defeating Incumbent Governor, AD's Niyi Adebayo and three other candidates.

Ayo Fayose emerged winner in the PDP gubernatorial primary election. His running mate was Abiodun Olujimi.

Electoral system
The Governor of Ekiti State is elected using the plurality voting system.

Results
A total of five candidates registered with the Independent National Electoral Commission to contest in the election. PDP candidate Ayo Fayose won election for a first tenure, defeating AD Incumbent Governor, Niyi Adebayo, and three other candidates.

The total number of registered voters in the state was 981,753. However, only 43.47% (i.e. 426,731) of registered voters participated in the exercise.

References 

Ekiti State gubernatorial elections
Gubernatorial election 2003
Ekiti State gubernatorial election